Koh Gou Young is a researcher from South Korea studying organ vasculature and lymphatic vessels with an interest in angiogenesis, lymphangiogenesis, adipogenesis, and cardiogenesis. His research has contributed to the publication of more than 200 journal articles, including multiple publications on how Tie2 deficits are related to sepsis, blood-retinal barrier damage, and an imbalance of intraocular pressure in Schlemm's canal which induces glaucoma.

He is a distinguished professor at KAIST and the founding director of the Institute for Basic Science Center for Vascular Research.

Education 
Koh received an M.D. and PhD in 1983 and 1991, respectively, from Chonbuk National University Medical School in Jeonju.

Career
Koh worked in the US for five years as a research fellow at Cornell University and then as a research associate at Indiana University. Upon returning to Korea in 1995, Koh started as an assistant professor and finished as an associate professor in Chonbuk National University Medical School before teaching at Pohang University of Science and Technology as an associate professor from 2001 until 2003. From 2003 to 2010 he was a professor in KAIST in the Department of Biological Science before becoming a distinguished professor in 2011 in the Graduate School of Medical Science and Engineering. He became the founding director of the IBS Center for Vascular Research in July 2015; their first in the field of basic medical sciences. He became a scientific member at the Max Planck Institute at Meunster in 2016 and a member of the National Academy of Sciences of the Republic of Korea in 2022.

He was on the editorial boards of Blood and Arteriosclerosis, Thrombosis, and Vascular Biology and is currently on the editorial board at Cancer Research.

Honors and awards 
 2020: Korea's Top 5 Bio-Field Research Results and News
 2020: Scientist of the Year Award
 2018: Ho-Am Prize in Medicine
 2012: Asan Award in Medicine
 2011: Kyung-Ahm Prize
 2011: Scientist of the Month
 2010: KAISTian of the Year Award (KAIST)
 2007: Wunsch Medical Award
 2002: Pfizer Medical Research Award

See also
 Platelet-derived growth factor receptor A

References

External links 
 IBS Center for Vascular Research
 Institute for Basic Science (IBS)

Academic staff of KAIST
People from Jeonju
Institute for Basic Science
1957 births
Living people
Recipients of the Ho-Am Prize in Medicine
Jeonbuk National University alumni
South Korean scientists